Justin Rafael Steven Gerlach (born 2 February 1990) is a German footballer who plays as a defender for CFC Hertha 06.

Career
On 12 June 2019 it was confirmed, that Gerlach had returned to Berliner AK 07 on a 2-year contract.

References

External links
 

1990 births
Living people
Footballers from Berlin
German footballers
Association football defenders
Hertha BSC II players
TSG Neustrelitz players
Berliner AK 07 players
FC Carl Zeiss Jena players
CFC Hertha 06 players
Regionalliga players
3. Liga players
Oberliga (football) players